The 1990–91 Yugoslav Ice Hockey League season was the 49th and final season of the Yugoslav Ice Hockey League, the top level of ice hockey in Yugoslavia. 10 teams participated in the league, and Medveščak have won the championship. For the 1991–92 season, Croatia, Serbia, and Slovenia set up their own national leagues.

Final ranking

Medveščak
Olimpija
Red Star
Jesenice
Vojvodina Novi Sad
Bled
Spartak Subotica
Partizan
Mladost
Slavija

External links
Season on eurohockey.com
Yugoslav Ice Hockey League seasons

1990–91
Yugo
1990–91 in Yugoslav ice hockey